Ernst Atis-Clotaire (born 9 December 1977) is a former Haitian-French footballer, who played three seasons for AS Monaco in Ligue 1.

Atis-Clotaire won the 1996 UEFA European Under-18 Championship with France and appeared for the Haiti national football team eleven times during Caribbean Cup competitions in 2000 and 2002.

References

External links

1977 births
Living people
Haiti international footballers
Haitian expatriate footballers
Haitian footballers
French footballers
French sportspeople of Haitian descent
Ligue 1 players
AS Monaco FC players
Association football forwards
France youth international footballers
Sportspeople from Port-au-Prince
SC Draguignan players